Aloísio Hilário de Pinho (14 January 1934 – 4 May 2021) was a Brazilian Roman Catholic bishop.

De Pinho was born in Brazil and was ordained to the priesthood in 1963. He served as bishop of the Roman Catholic Diocese of Tocantinópolis, Brazil, from 1982 to 2000 and as bishop of the Roman Catholic Diocese of Jataí, Brazil, from 2000 to 2009.

Notes

1934 births
2021 deaths
20th-century Roman Catholic bishops in Brazil
21st-century Roman Catholic bishops in Brazil
People from Minas Gerais
Roman Catholic bishops of Jataí
Roman Catholic bishops of Tocantinópolis